The 2014 Júbilo Iwata season saw the club compete in the J1 League, the top tier of Japanese football, in which they finished 13th.

J1 League

League table

Match details

References

External links
 J.League official site

Júbilo Iwata
Júbilo Iwata seasons